Legend of the World is the third studio album by the American rock band Valient Thorr, released in 2006.

Track listing
 "Heatseeker" - 4:06
 "Rezerection" - 4:24
 "Exit Strategy" - 3:56
 "Lime Green Net" - 4:20
 "Stormstris" - 3:26
 "Goveruptcy" - 3:18
 "False Profits" - 3:40
 "Triceratops" - 2:47
 "Fall of Pangea" - 7:01
 "Problem Solver" - 3:20
 "Con Science" - 3:20
 "Har Megiddo" - 4:53
 "Yusuf Abdelaziz" - 4:53

Reception

Legend of the World received mostly positive reviews.

In popular culture
The song "Fall of Pangea" is available as a bonus track in the music video game Guitar Hero II.
The song "Heatseeker" is used as a song track in the racing video game Need for Speed: Carbon.

References

2006 albums
Valient Thorr albums
Volcom Entertainment albums